Erich Nigg (born 28 November 1952 in Uster) is a Swiss cell biologist.

Life 
Erich Nigg received his PhD in 1980 from the ETH Zürich (Biochemistry). Subsequently, he carried out research at the University of California in San Diego, the ETH Zürich and the Swiss Institute for Experimental Cancer Research (ISREC). From 1995 he was Professor of Molecular Biology at the University of Geneva before he was appointed, in 1999, to a Directorship at the Max Planck Institute of Biochemistry in Martinsried, Germany. From 2009 - 2018 was Erich Nigg Professor of Cell Biology and Director of the Biozentrum at the University of Basel, Switzerland.

Work 

After early work on biological membranes, the structure of the cell nucleus and mechanisms of intracellular signal transduction, Erich Nigg's research focused on the cell cycle. His studies contribute to our understanding of the segregation of human chromosomes during cell division, the regulation of mitosis, as well as the structure and function of human centrosomes. This work is  relevant to understanding diseases, because mitotic errors contribute to the genetic instability of cancer cells and centrosome abnormalities are known to cause disease (brain diseases and ciliopathies).

Awards and honors 
 1991: Elected Member of the European Molecular Biology Organization (EMBO)
 1992: Friedrich Miescher Prize
 1993: Robert Wenner Prize for Cancer Research
 1998: Elected Member of the Academia Europaea
 2004: Meyenburg Prize of Wilhelm and Maria Meyenburg Foundation
 2009: Elected member of the European Academy of Cancer Sciences

External links 
 Prof. Dr. Erich A. Nigg, Emeritus
 Biozentrum University of Basel
 University of Basel

References 

Living people
University of California, San Diego alumni
University of Geneva alumni
Members of the European Molecular Biology Organization
Biozentrum University of Basel
People from Uster
1952 births
Max Planck Institute directors